(Madam Chrysanthemum) is an opera, described as a , with music by André Messager to a libretto by Georges Hartmann and Alexandre André, after the semi-autobiographical novel Madame Chrysanthème (1887) by Pierre Loti. It consists of four acts with a prologue and an epilogue and is set in Nagasaki, Japan.

Background
Prior to Madame Chrysanthème, Messager had begun to establish himself as a composer with several ballet scores performed, success at the Opéra-Comique in 1890 with La Basoche and incidental music for the play Hélène in 1891. Refused by Carvalho at the Opéra-Comique Madame Chrysanthème was first performed at the Théâtre de la Renaissance in Paris on 21 January 1893 with Jane Guy and Louis Delaquerrière in the principal roles; there were 16 performances at the theatre in the first year.

There were two performances in Monte Carlo on 21 December 1901 and 3 January 1902 with Mary Garden and Edmond Clément in the principal roles. The opera was also seen at the Théâtre Royal de la Monnaie, Brussels, on 9 November 1906, in Montreal in 1912, and by the Chicago Opera Association in Chicago and New York (Lexington Theatre) in 1920 with Tamaki Miura, Charles Fontaine and Hector Dufranne.

Although both operas can be traced back to the same original literary source, Puccini's Madama Butterfly and Madame Chrysanthème contrast strongly especially with the mainly internal world of the Puccini setting. The alternation of acts in public and private spaces in Messager's work provides other aspects on the Japan as depicted in the opera, reminding the listener of a teeming world effectively beyond the reach of Europeans: between Messager and Puccini there is a significant contrast between Pierre's failure to understand and master Chrysanthème and Pinkerton's dominance and possession of Butterfly. Messager's librettists changed Loti's original cynical attachment between the main characters into a more genuine love affair, as well as creating the jealous conflict between the two sailors.

A highlight of the score is the soprano aria "".

Roles

Synopsis

Prologue
After an orchestral introduction the curtain rises on the bridge of a French battleship; two officers, Pierre and Yves are leaning on the balustrade while the topman sings. Pierre sings of his dream of a Japanese love affair. A naval fanfare announces the arrival in port and the scene changes:

Act 1
On arrival in Nagasaki the ship is invaded by merchants, who are then followed by geishas, who dance, among whom is one with whom Pierre immediately falls in love. Born in Yeddo she was abandoned as a child. Before she can give Pierre her name Yves announces the arrival of Kangarou, a jack-of-all-trades, but also a marriage broker. Despite Kangarou fussing, her adopted parents Sucre and Prune are introduced. Pierre contracts a "Japanese marriage" with his chosen geisha, and at the end of the act Kangarou announces Chrysanthème's name.

Act 2
After an orchestral entr'acte the tableau begins in the garden of Chrysanthème, with Prune paying devotions to Buddha. She parts the screens behind which Chrysanthème and Pierre still sleep. Chrysanthème arranges flowers around the house. Pierre declares his love but Chrysanthème chides him. At the end Pierre and Chrysanthème's friends arrive and congratulate the couple and Oyouki sings in Breton mode.

Act 3
In front of the temple of Osueva a festival takes place with a chants and dances. After Chrysanthème has sung her song, Pierre is furious and jealous arguments break out between Yves and Pierre. The act ends with a procession, and chorus of priests.

Act 4
Chrysanthème and Oyouki are heard singing off-stage. Pierre enters the garden and reflects on the emotions evoked by the song. There is a reconciliation between the characters. A cannon shot is heard and Yves enters joyfully looking forward to his return to his family in Brittany. After farewells, Chrysanthème gives Yves a letter to pass on to Pierre once they are at sea.

Epilogue
(Same setting as in the Prologue). After an interlude, out at sea Pierre reads Chrysanthème's letter in which she wrote that although she was smiling when they parted, he should remember, when far away, that in Japan that there are women who love, and cry. He tosses the lotus flowers she had given him into the sea and asks to forget his Japanese marriage.

Notes and references
Notes

References

French-language operas
1893 operas
Operas
Operas by André Messager
Operas based on novels
Operas set in Japan
Japan in non-Japanese culture